The 2020 SWAC men's basketball tournament was the postseason men's basketball tournament for the Southwestern Athletic Conference during the 2019–20 season. Tournament first-round games were played at the campus of the higher seeded team on March 10. The remainder of the tournament was to be held on March 13 and 14, 2020 at Bartow Arena in Birmingham, Alabama. The tournament champion would have received the SWAC's automatic bid to the 2020 NCAA tournament. On March 12, the remainder of the SWAC Tournament, along with all other NCAA postseason tournaments, was cancelled amid the COVID-19 pandemic.

Seeds
The top eight teams qualified for the conference tournament. Teams were seeded by conference record, with a tiebreaker system used for teams with identical conference records. The top 4 seeds hosted their quarterfinal round games.

Schedule and results

Bracket

First round games at campus sites of lower-numbered seeds

References

2019–20 Southwestern Athletic Conference men's basketball season
SWAC men's basketball tournament
SWAC men's basketball tournament
College sports tournaments in Alabama
Basketball competitions in Birmingham, Alabama
SWAC men's basketball tournament
SWAC men's basketball tournament